Emblemariopsis is a genus of flagblennies found throughout the Atlantic ocean.

Species
There are currently 14 recognized species in this genus:
 Emblemariopsis arawak Victor, 2010
 Emblemariopsis bahamensis J. S. Stephens, 1961 (Blackhead blenny)
 Emblemariopsis bottomei J. S. Stephens, 1961 (Shorthead blenny)
 Emblemariopsis carib Victor, 2010
 Emblemariopsis dianae J. C. Tyler & Hastings, 2004 (Orangeflag blenny)
 Emblemariopsis diaphana Longley, 1927 (Glass blenny)
 Emblemariopsis falcon Victor 2020
 Emblemariopsis lancea Victor 2020
 Emblemariopsis leptocirris J. S. Stephens, 1970
 Emblemariopsis occidentalis J. S. Stephens, 1970 (Flagfin blenny)
 Emblemariopsis pricei D. W. Greenfield, 1975 (Seafan blenny)
 Emblemariopsis ramirezi (Cervigón, 1999)
 Emblemariopsis randalli Cervigón, 1965 (Hornless blenny)
 Emblemariopsis ruetzleri D. M. Tyler & J. C. Tyler, 1997
 Emblemariopsis signifer (Ginsburg, 1942)
 Emblemariopsis tayrona (Acero P., 1987) (Tayrona blenny)

References

 
Chaenopsidae
Fish of the Caribbean